The Sydney Orbital Network is a 110 kilometre motorway standard ring road around and through Sydney, the capital of New South Wales in Australia. It runs north from Sydney Airport, underneath the CBD to the North Shore, west to the Hills District, south to Prestons and then east to connect with the airport. Much of the road is privately owned and financed by tolls.

History
Planning for this beltway, orbital or ring road began as early as 1962 under the "County of Cumberland scheme" (CCS) and was talked about as far back as 1944. Then, from 1973 to 1989, things started to take shape with new sections opening-up and then further advancing by 1999. In 2007, the Lane Cove Tunnel opened, completing the orbital network.

Motorways that make up the orbital road

The 110 km Sydney orbital consists of several motorways and freeways, they are listed below:
 Eastern Distributor
 Southern Cross Drive
 General Holmes Drive
 M5 Motorway
 Westlink M7
 M2 Hills Motorway
 Lane Cove Tunnel
 Gore Hill Freeway
 Warringah Freeway
 Sydney Harbour Tunnel 

The major sunken/underground sections of the orbital are:
Sydney Harbour Tunnel
Eastern Distributor
M5 East tunnel
Epping Tunnel (M2 Hills Motorway, although not really a major tunnel)
Sunken Section of the M2 Hills Motorway (The trench between Epping Road)
Lane Cove Tunnel

The major elevated sections are:
Parts of the Westlink M7
Parts of Southern Cross Drive and General Holmes Drive (past the airport)

There is significant upgrade work occurring as part of the WestConnex project, which will see the M5 duplicated (total of 4 lanes each way) along with the addition of new freeways to the Sydney network.

Tolling
The Sydney Orbital Road Network consists of a number of roads built by private companies: tolling is mostly unavoidable when using the road network. A $6.95 toll was added to the M5 East motorway from King Georges Road to Marsh Street on the 5th of July 2020, to coincide with the opening of the M8 tunnel.

Highway links
Intercity highways are linked to the Orbital, moving traffic away from the old busy National Routes. They are:

NorthConnex - linking M1 Pacific Motorway, Newcastle and Brisbane to M2 Hills Motorway
M4 Motorway - linking Great Western Highway and Bathurst to Westlink M7
Hume Motorway - linking Melbourne and Canberra to M5 Motorway and Westlink M7
King Georges Road - linking Princes Highway, Princes Motorway and Wollongong to M5 Motorway

Proposed or missing freeway/motorway links
M6 Motorway – A proposal that links the New M5 Tunnels and the southern suburbs of Sydney, as the M6 Motorway. The only section which was built is the Captain Cook Bridge and its approaches. Land is still reserved north of this point through Sandringham, and south through the Royal National Park. In October 2017, the government announced it will proceed with Stage 1 of the F6 extension, which will run via two 4 km tunnels linking the New M5 tunnels at Arncliffe to President Avenue at Kogarah. In October 2019, the government announced a name change of the extension to M6 Motorway and also confirmed the completion date of Stage 1 would be pushed back to late 2025, with major construction to begin by early 2022.
WestConnex – A proposal that incorporates the M5 duplication project and the M4 East extension of the M4 Motorway to the M5 Motorway, involving a cutting along Parramatta Road, a tunnel from Tavener's Hill to St Peters and a surface motorway to the M5 at Arncliffe.

See also

References

External links
Timelapse footage of the whole Sydney Orbital Network on YouTube
RTA Orbital Network Website
 NSW Bike Plan - Bicycle Information for New South Wales

Highways in Sydney
Ring roads in Australia